Sol Pereyra is an Argentinean singer, musician and composer who began her solo career in Mexico in 2009. She has received three nominations for the Gardel Awards, for her album Tírame agua (2014), for her single "Antireversa" (2019) and for her album Resisto (2020) in the best alternative pop album category.

Career

Los Cocineros 
Together with Mara Santucho and Alfonso Barbieri she formed the trio Los Cocineros in 2001 in the province of Córdoba. A year later she released with the trio the album Peras al elmo, followed by La hazaña rellena in 2004. Later she recorded the albums Niños revueltos and Morrón y cuenta nueva before leaving the group to begin a solo career.

Solo career 
After participating on the Julieta Venegas album MTV Unplugged in 2008, she moved to Mexico, where she has developed much of her solo career. To date, Pereyra has released six albums, Bla bla bla (2009), Comunmixta (2012), Tírame agua (2014), Préndete (2017), Resisto (2019) and Existo (2020). Her song "Nadie te preguntó", from the album Tírame agua, earned her international recognition, registering more than ten million views on YouTube. Her 2020 single "De aquí para allá" was included in the Netflix series La casa de las flores.

In August 2020 she was called to perform a tribute to commemorate the 30th anniversary of the album Canción Animal by the band Soda Stereo, accompanied by other artists such as Pedro Aznar, El Kuelgue and Lisandro Aristimuño. Pereyra covered the song "Un millón de años luz", second track of the mentioned album.

Discography

With Los Cocineros 

 Peras al olmo (2001) Independent
 La hazaña rellena (2002) Independent
 Niños revueltos (2003) Independent
 Morrón y cuenta nueva (2004) GLD
 Platos voladores (2005) GLD
 Los cocineros en vivo en el Teatro Comedia (2006) Independent
 Diente libre (2009) Independent

As a soloist 

 Blablabla (2009) Independent
 Comunmixta (2011) S Music Argentina
 Tírame agua (2014) S Music Argentina
 Préndete (2017) S Music Argentina
 Resisto (2019) S Music Argentina/Cassette México
 Existo (2020)

References

External links 

20th-century births
Argentine actresses
21st-century Argentine women singers
Argentine composers
Living people
Year of birth missing (living people)